John Macdonald Steele (23 June 1953 – 2 March 2022), better known as John Stahl, was a Scottish actor best known for playing Rickard Karstark in HBO's Game of Thrones and Tom 'Inverdarroch' Kerr in High Road.

Life and career
Stahl was born on 23 June 1953 in Sauchie, Clackmannanshire.

John was educated at Alloa Academy and studied at the Royal Scottish Academy of Music and Drama. From 1975 to 1976, Stahl worked as an assistant director in the Darlington Drama Centre. His screen debut was in 1976. He found fame for his role as Tom 'Inverdarroch' Kerr in the television series High Road, in which he appeared as a series regular between 1982 and 2003. He also played the role of Rickard Karstark in HBO's Game of Thrones, appearing in the second and third seasons. His other roles include Inspector Reed in the 1995 television series Resort to Murder, and as Ewan in the 2011 Royal National Theatre production Frankenstein.

Stahl lived on the Isle of Lewis and was a supporter of Scottish independence. He died from cancer on 2 March 2022, at the age of 68.

Filmography

Film

Television

References

External links 
 
 

1953 births
2022 deaths 
Deaths from cancer in Scotland
20th-century Scottish male actors
21st-century Scottish male actors
People from Clackmannanshire
Scottish male film actors
Scottish male television actors